Abdelkader Yaiche (born 7 September 1953) is an Algerian football manager.

References

External links
 

1953 births
Living people
Algerian football managers
CA Bordj Bou Arréridj managers
USM Blida managers
MC El Eulma managers
USM Bel Abbès managers
CR Belouizdad managers
USM El Harrach managers
NA Hussein Dey managers
USM Alger managers
AS Aïn M'lila managers
Algerian Ligue Professionnelle 1 managers
21st-century Algerian people